The 2006 (18th annual) World Music Awards were held in London, England and hosted by Lindsay Lohan on 15 November 2006.

Performances included a "Thriller" recreation by Chris Brown and a children's chorus rendition of "We Are the World" with Michael Jackson. The latter would end up being Jackson's final live performance (in fact, it was more a participation). Other performers included Andrea Bocelli, Beyoncé, Bob Sinclar, Dima Bilan, Elissa, Enya, Faithless, Katie Melua, Nelly Furtado, Rihanna, Tokio Hotel, and Suleman Mirza.

Presenters included Pamela Anderson, Natalie Imbruglia, Donatella Versace, Sugababes, Nicole Richie, Denise Richards and Brian McFadden.

The World Music Awards ceremony was televised in 160 countries including the United States, Canada, Europe, Australia, Japan, Southeast Asia, China, Africa and the Middle East. In the United Kingdom it was broadcast on Channel 4 on 23 November 2006. In the U.S., ABC is the traditional home of the World Music Awards, but in recent years they have moved to MyNetworkTV, which rebroadcast the 2006 show on 1 July 2009, due to that show's tributes to the recently deceased Michael Jackson.

Diamond Award
The Diamond Award honors those recording-artists who have sold over 100 million albums during their career.  Past recipients include Mariah Carey, Celine Dion, Rod Stewart and Bon Jovi.  This year's recipient was Michael Jackson (awarded by Beyoncé).  His most popular album, "Thriller" has sold more than 104 million copies worldwide since its release in 1982 - making it the best-selling album of all time.

Legend Award
 For Outstanding Contribution to R&B music: Mary J. Blige

Winners

Classical
World's Best Selling Classical Artist: Domenico Tranchitella

DJ
World's Best Selling DJ: Bob Sinclar
Runners-up: Paul Oakenfold, Fatboy Slim, Shapeshifters and Deep Dish

Latin
World's Best Selling Latin Artist: Shakira
Runners-up: Daddy Yankee, RBD, Mana and Juanes

New
World's Best Selling New Artist: James Blunt 
Runners-up: Carrie Underwood, Pussycat Dolls, KT Tunstall and Gnarls Barkley

Pop
World's Best Selling Pop Artist: Madonna
Runners-up: Robbie Williams, James Blunt, Shakira and Justin Timberlake

Pop Rock
World's Best Selling Pop Rock Artist: Nelly Furtado
Runners-up: KT Tunstall, Pink, Gwen Stefani and John Mayer

R&B
World's Best Selling R&B Artist: Beyoncé
Runners-up: Mary J Blige, Rihanna, Jamie Foxx and Chris Brown

Rap Hip Hop
World's Best Selling Rap Hip Hop Artist: Kanye West
Runners-up: Sean Paul, T.I., Busta Rhymes and Chamillionaire
Sort mammt

Rock
World's Best Selling Rock Artist: Nickelback
Runners-up: Coldplay, Red Hot Chili Peppers, Green Day and Keane

Regional Awards
Best Selling Arabic Artist: Elissa
Best Selling Barbadian Artist: Rihanna
Best Selling Chinese Artist: Jay Chou
Best Selling German Artist: Tokio Hotel
Best Selling Irish Artist: Enya
Best Selling Italian Artist: Andrea Bocelli 
Best Selling Middle Eastern Artist: Elissa 
Best Selling Russian Artist: Dima Bilan
Best Selling U.K. Artist: James Blunt
Best Selling U.S. Artist: Madonna

References

External links
The 2006 World Music Awards at the Internet Movie Database

World Music Awards, 2006
Lists of World Music Award winners